Samuel Greene Wheeler Benjamin (February 13, 1837 – July 19, 1914) was an American journalist, author, artist, and diplomat..

His parents were American missionaries in Greece. He was born in Argos, Greece, but then educated in the United States, receiving an A.B. from Williams College in 1859.

American Minister to Persia
Prior to his ascendancy to ministership, Benjamin had been appointed as the Chargé d'Affaires to Persia but did not proceed to this post. In 1883, he was appointed as the first American Minister to Persia (modern-day Iran). Arriving at the port city of Rasht, cannon fire, elegant banquets, and many gifts were presented to Benjamin and his family. However, while at the palace of the provincial governor, Benjamin received a message that the Shah would be departing Tehran for the summer holiday and that no foreign envoys were allowed into Tehran without the Shah's presence. Traveling two hundred miles in only two days, Benjamin arrived at Tehran's gates with the escort of nearly a thousand royal guards. Having finally his audience with the Persian monarch, Benjamin read a speech penned by the American president Chester A Arthur.

Despite being in the capital city, Benjamin remained houseless. In the year prior, 1882, The State Department had only approved a $5000 salary with an additional $3000 for travel related expenses. On top of the meager salary the State Department did not purchase office space for the new American legation. The inadequacy of what was provided to him vexed Benjamin whose irascible and bombastic personality  often made diplomacy a matter of competition between him and other European diplomats. In fact, within his first day of arriving in Tehran Benjamin purchased a hundred-foot flagpole so as to most proudly fly the American flag.

Despite his contentious relationships with the German, British, Russian diplomatic ranks, Benjamin cared for and deeply respected his Persian hosts, culture, and religion. His unfettered commitment to an amicable U.S. – Persian relationship were also partially motivated by acting to counterbalance European control in Persia. Benjamin witnessed the success of European investment in Persia and encouraged American investment as well, but with an isolationist foreign policy, American businesses would have to take all the risk without their government's support. In 1885, with the election of Grover Cleveland, a Democrat, Benjamin left his post in Tehran. In 1886 he wrote a popular book called Persia and the Persians, the first widely circulated book on Persian culture for the greater American audience.

It was he who first drafted the diplomatic code used by the American legation in Persia.

Later life
As a journalist, Benjamin served as American art editor for the Magazine of Art and covered the Crimean War with the London Illustrated News. He was also a marine painter and illustrator. Benjamin wrote poetry and books on Persia, Greece, Turkey, and American and European art. In his autobiography, "The Life and Adventures of a Free Lance," Benjamin commented on his friendships with artists in New York including William Holbrook Beard, Frederic Edwin Church, Sanford R. Gifford, and Launt Thompson.

Benjamin died in Burlington, Vermont in 1914 and is buried in Lakeview Cemetery.

See also
US-Iran relations

References

Lorentz, J.: Historical Dictionary of Iran, 1995. .
Olsen, T.: S. G. W. Benjamin, Thomson-Gale 2005/06. URL last accessed 2007-02-20.
Political Graveyard: Benjamin, Samuel Greene Wheeler. URL last accessed 2007-02-20.

External links
 
 
 
Hudson River school visions: the landscapes of Sanford R. Gifford, an exhibition catalog from The Metropolitan Museum of Art (fully available online as PDF), which contains material on Benjamin (see index)

1837 births
1914 deaths
19th-century American diplomats
Ambassadors of the United States to Iran
American male journalists
Burials at Lakeview Cemetery (Burlington, Vermont)